Cordelia Maria Edvardson (née Langgässer; 1 January 1929 – 29 October 2012) was a German-born Swedish journalist, author and Holocaust survivor. She was the Jerusalem correspondent for Svenska Dagbladet, a Swedish daily newspaper, from 1977 to 2006. Edvardson reported extensively on the Israeli–Palestinian conflict, remaining a columnist for Svenska Dagbladet after leaving her post in 2006.

Background
Edvardson was born in Munich, Germany, in 1929. She was raised Catholic. However, since her father, Hermann Heller, was Jewish, Edvardson was arrested by the Nazis and deported to the Theresienstadt and Auschwitz concentration camps during the Holocaust. Her maternal grandfather had also been Jewish, and converted to Catholicism.

After immigrating to Sweden after World War II, Edvardson began her journalism career. In 1984, she published an autobiography documenting her life as a Holocaust survivor, which earned her the Geschwister-Scholl-Preis literary prize.

Passing

Cordelia Edvardson died from an illness in Stockholm on 29 October 2012, at the age of 83.

References

Further reading
 

1929 births
2012 deaths
Swedish newspaper journalists
Swedish columnists
Swedish autobiographers
Swedish-language writers
Auschwitz concentration camp survivors
Theresienstadt Ghetto survivors
German emigrants to Sweden
German people of Austrian-Jewish descent
German women journalists
Swedish women journalists
20th-century Swedish journalists
21st-century Swedish journalists
Officers Crosses of the Order of Merit of the Federal Republic of Germany
Women autobiographers
Swedish women columnists
German women columnists